The following is the list of members of the Dewan Negara (Senate) of the 14th Malaysian Parliament as of May 2021. 26 out of 70 senators, i.e. two senators for each state, are elected by their respective State Legislative Assembly for three-year term. The other 44, including four senators representing Federal Territories, are appointed by the Yang di-Pertuan Agong also for three-year term.

Previously, National Front (BN); together with Pan-Malaysian Islamic Party (PAS), remains the majority in the Dewan Negara despite the Alliance of Hope (PH); together with Sabah Heritage Party (WARISAN) and United Pasokmomogun Kadazandusun Murut Organisation (UPKO) becomes the new governing party in the Dewan Rakyat, which is in the new current present Parliament. This is due to the constitutional nature that senators are not elected directly by the people, but instead elected by the State Legislative Assembly or appointed by the Yang di-Pertuan Agong, which most of senatorial elections or appointments took place in the previous parliamentary term, i.e. the 13th Parliament.

Current composition 
The current composition of the Dewan Negara is correct as of November 2022.

Incumbent members
As of 7 November 2022, Senators are:

Former members 
Since 16 July 2018, the following members exited the Dewan Negara.

Footnotes

References

14th Parliament of Malaysia
Lists of members of the Dewan Negara